South Weymouth is an MBTA Commuter Rail station in Weymouth, Massachusetts. It serves the Plymouth/Kingston Line, and is located on the west side of the former South Weymouth Naval Air Station in the South Weymouth village.

History

South Weymouth station opened along with on the Old Colony Railroad in 1845. The railroad built a small wood-frame depot, which served as the station facilities for the next 114 years. The line closed on June 30, 1959, after the completion of the Southeast Expressway. The building was used by a drywall company for two decades. It was bought in 2001; in 2005, the entire building was placed on jacks and rotated from its original location to face Pond Street. The building was initially used as a general store, then as a sports memorabilia shop beginning in 2010.

The MBTA began restoring the Old Colony Lines for commuter service in the 1990s. The new South Weymouth station was located south of the town center and the old station on land formerly part of South Weymouth Naval Air Station. The station opened along with the Kingston/Plymouth Line and the Middleborough/Lakeville Line on September 29, 1997.

References

External links

 MBTA - South Weymouth
 Station from Trotter Road from Google Maps Street View

MBTA Commuter Rail stations in Norfolk County, Massachusetts
Railway stations in the United States opened in 1997